Stash (formerly Stache) is a Belgian music band that out of almost nowhere scored a monster hit in Flanders with the title "Sadness" in 2004–2005.

The hit single broke the records of the hit list of the VRT, the Ultratop by being both the longest present track in the top 10 as well as the longest present track in the entire Ultratop 75. In the videoclip "Sadness", several famous Flemish musical artists appear, like Axl Peleman, Guy Swinnen, Luc De Vos and Walter Grootaers. In the clip of "Shelter from Evil Ones", the mothers of the four band members play music as well.

In the summer of 2005, they could be seen at Rock Werchter and Marktrock, among others. The front man of Stash is Gunther Verspecht.

Discography

Singles 

"Sadness"
"Shelter from Evil Ones"
"Carving the Pain"
"I Need a Woman", a duet with Sam Bettens
"All That's Left"
"Fading Out"
"Empty Your Gun"

Albums 

Rock 'n Roll Show (2005)
Blue Lanes (2007)
All That Fire (2009)

References

External links
Official website

Belgian rock music groups
Musical groups established in 1997